Deccan College may refer to:

 Deccan College Post-Graduate and Research Institute (Pune, India)
 Deccan College of Engineering and Technology (Hyderabad, India)
 Deccan College of Medical Sciences, a medical college in Hyderabad, India.